Vilano Beach is an unincorporated community in St. Johns County, Florida, United States. It was listed as the  Villano Beach census-designated place (CDP) by the U.S. Census Bureau from 2010 to 1990; however, the name was corrected to Vilano Beach for the 2020 census. The population was 2,514 at the 2020 census.

Geography

Demographics

As of the census of 2000, there were 2,533 people, 1,168 households, and 746 families in the CDP. The racial makeup of the CDP was 97.32% White, 0.47% African American, 0.36% Native American, 0.71% Asian, 0.39% from other races, and 0.75% from two or more races. Hispanic or Latino of any race were 1.38% of the population.

Of the 1,168 households 20.1% had children under the age of 18 living with them, 54.2% were married couples living together, 6.2% had a female householder with no husband present, and 36.1% were non-families. 27.0% of households were one person and 8.0% were one person aged 65 or older.  The average household size was 2.16 and the average family size was 2.58.

The age distribution was 15.2% under the age of 18, 5.8% from 18 to 24, 27.2% from 25 to 44, 35.5% from 45 to 64, and 16.2% 65 or older.  The median age was 46 years. For every 100 females, there were 94.0 males.  For every 100 females age 18 and over, there were 94.5 males.

The median household income was $54,111 and the median family income  was $75,070. Males had a median income of $49,219 versus $37,353 for females. The per capita income for the CDP was $34,635.  About 1.5% of families and 4.9% of the population were below the poverty line, including 1.8% of those under age 18 and 4.7% of those age 65 or over.

Education
It is in the St. Johns County School District.

It is zoned to Keterlinus Elementary School, Sebastian Middle School, and St. Augustine High School.

References

External links 
  U.S. Army Corps of Engineers, Jacksonville District. St. Johns County, Florida, South Ponte Vedra Beach, Vilano Beach, and Summer Haven Reaches. Coastal Storm Risk Management Project Final Integrated Feasibility Study and Environmental Assessment. March 2017.

Census-designated places in St. Johns County, Florida
Beaches of St. Johns County, Florida
Census-designated places in the Jacksonville metropolitan area
Census-designated places in Florida
Populated coastal places in Florida on the Atlantic Ocean
Beaches of Florida